Honorable Wu (born Ho Chee Chung, and also known as Harry Haw) was an American vaudevillian and film actor who worked in Hollywood in the 1930s and 1940s. Born in San Francisco to Chinese immigrants, he died in 1945 in Los Angeles. His sister Florence Ho also appeared in a number of films.

Selected filmography 

 The Blonde from Singapore (1941)
 Passage from Hong Kong (1941)
 Ellery Queen and the Perfect Crime (1941)
 Ellery Queen's Penthouse Mystery (1941)
 Mr. Moto Takes a Vacation (1939)
 North of Shanghai (1939)
 The Crime of Doctor Hallet (1938)
 Stowaway (1936)

References 

American male actors of Chinese descent
1896 births
1945 deaths
American male film actors
Male actors from San Francisco
Vaudeville performers